Cameron John Wake (born 28 June 1985) is an English cricketer.  Wake is a right-handed batsman who bowls leg break.  He was born in Kettering, Northamptonshire.

He attended Oundle School and was Captain in 2004. Whilst at School he played for England U17 and Captain England Schools’ U18 as well as appearing in several ECB Development sides. He was contracted to Northamptonshire as an academy player whilst in the 6th Form.

Wake made his debut for Bedfordshire in the 2005 Minor Counties Championship, making two appearances, one each against Norfolk and Cumberland.  The following season he made his first-class debut while studying for his degree at Durham University for Durham UCCE against Surrey at the Oval.He made two further first-class appearances against Nottinghamshire and Lancashire.  In his three first-class matches, he scored 47 runs at an average of 9.40, with a high score of 34.  With the ball, he took 2 wickets at a bowling average of 45.00, with best figures of 1/24.

Toward the tailend of the 2006 season, Wake played three Minor Counties Championship matches for Cambridgeshire, before returning to Bedfordshire in 2008.  He made four Minor Counties Championship appearances for the county in that season, but since then has only appeared in MCCA Knockout Trophy matches. After two years teaching at Sherborne School, where he was the first XI cricket coach, he then spent five years teaching overseas in Dubai, UAE where he played club cricket. Wake returned to the UK in 2022 as a Geography specialist teaching at Repton School where he was appointed Master I/C Cricket.

References

External links
 

1985 births
Living people
Sportspeople from Kettering
English cricketers
Bedfordshire cricketers
Durham MCCU cricketers
Cambridgeshire cricketers
Northamptonshire Cricket Board cricketers
Alumni of the College of St Hild and St Bede, Durham
People educated at Oundle School